National Highway 8 (NR8) is the most important highway of southeastern Burma. It connects Payagyi to Myeik.

At Thaton, it joins National Road 85.

AH1
Roads in Myanmar